Thomas Lambert may refer to:

Politicians
Thomas Lambert (died 1604) (died 1604), MP for Wareham, England
Thomas Lambert (died 1621) (1558–1621), English MP for Southampton
Thomas Lambert (died 1638) (1585–1638), English politician, MP for Hindon

Sports
Thomas Lambert (skier) (born 1984), Swiss freestyle skier
Tom Lambert (cricketer) (born 1981), English cricketer
Tom Lambert (rugby union) (born 2000), Scottish rugby union player

Others
Thomas Eyre Lambert (1820–1919), Irish soldier and landlord
Thomas Lambert (horticulturist) (1854–1944), New Zealand doctor, horticulturist, journalist, and writer
Thomas Lambert (priest) (died 1694), English Anglican priest
Thomas Drummond Lambert (1837–1911), English veterinary surgeon
Thomas Scott Lambert (1819–1897), American physician
Thomas Stanton Lambert, British Army officer
Thomas Lambert House, in Rowley, Massachusetts
Thomas Lambert of the Lambert baronets